"Three Hearts in a Tangle" is a song written by Ray Pennington and Sonny Thompson. It was first recorded by Pennington under the pseudonym "Ray Starr" for King Records in 1958. Pennington was unsatisfied with the quality of the recording and had it quickly withdrawn. In 1961 Roy Drusky made a hit recording of the song which reached No. 2 on the Country chart and No. 35 on the Billboard Hot 100. Other performers who have recorded the song include Dave Dudley, Leroy Van Dyke, and George and Gwen McCrae.

References

Roy Drusky songs
James Brown songs
Leroy Van Dyke songs
Songs written by Ray Pennington
Songs written by Sonny Thompson
1961 singles
1962 singles
1958 songs
Decca Records singles
King Records (United States) singles